Joshelyn Estefanía Sánchez Maldonado (born 16 July 1992) is an Ecuadorian footballer who plays as a forward for Super Liga Femenina club CD El Nacional. She has been a member of the Ecuador women's national team.

International career
Sánchez represented Ecuador at the 2008 South American U-17 Women's Championship. At senior level, she played the 2010 South American Women's Football Championship.

International goals
Scores and results list Ecuador's goal tally first

References

1992 births
Living people
Women's association football forwards
Ecuadorian women's footballers
Footballers from Quito
Ecuador women's international footballers
L.D.U. Quito Femenino players
C.D. El Nacional Femenino players
Ecuadorian women's futsal players
Place of birth missing (living people)
21st-century Ecuadorian women